Hengshan Township is a rural township in Hsinchu County, Taiwan. It had an estimated population of 12,226 as of February 2023.

Administrative divisions
Dadu, Fengtian, Fengxiang, Fuxing, Hengshan, Lixing, Nanchang, Neiwan, Shakeng, Tianliao and Xinxing Village.

Tourist attractions
 Liu Hsing-chin Comic Museum
 Neiwan Theater

Transportation

 TRA Fugui Station, Hengshan Station, Hexing Station, Jiuzantou Station and Neiwan Station.

References

External links

  

Townships in Hsinchu County